Natália Mafiela Kamalandua Fonseca (born 25 December 1998) is an Angolan female handball player for Petro de Luanda and the Angolan national team.

She represented Angola at the 2017 World Women's Handball Championship in Germany.

Achievements 
Carpathian Trophy:
Winner: 2019

References

External links
 

Angolan female handball players
1998 births
Living people
Handball players at the 2020 Summer Olympics